Demos Memneloum (born 10 June 1994) is a Chadian judoka who competes in the women's middleweight (70 kg) category. She won bronze medals at the 2019 African Judo Championships in Cape Town and the 2019 African Games in Rabat.

In 2021, she competed in the women's 70 kg event at the 2020 Summer Olympics in Tokyo, Japan.

References

External links
 

1994 births
Living people
Chadian female judoka
African Games bronze medalists for Chad
Competitors at the 2019 African Games
People from N'Djamena
African Games medalists in judo
Olympic judoka of Chad
Judoka at the 2020 Summer Olympics